Susan Damante (born June 17, 1950; formally credited as Susan Damante-Shaw) is an American actress who has starred in various films and television programs. She is the mother of Vinessa Shaw and Natalie Shaw (both actresses).

Personal life
Damante is a Nichiren Buddhist and a member of Soka Gakkai International. She suffers from Crohn's disease.

Partial filmography
Blood Sabbath (1972)
Emergency! TV series 2 episodes (1972)
The Great American Beauty Contest (1973)
The Student Teachers (1973)
The Photographer (1974)
The Rockford Files TV series 1 episode (1974)
The Adventures of the Wilderness Family  (1975)
Columbo: Troubled Waters (1975)
Further Adventures of the Wilderness Family  (1978)
Mountain Family Robinson (1979)
Dallas (1982)
Falcon Crest TV series 3 episodes (1986)
Ladybugs (1992)
No Easy Way (1996)
Coyote Summer (1996)

References

External links

1950 births
20th-century American actresses
21st-century American actresses
Living people
Actresses from California
American film actresses
American television actresses
Actresses from Palo Alto, California
Members of Sōka Gakkai
People with Crohn's disease